Jade Seah  (born on 6 April 1983) is a Singaporean model, host and actress, of mixed Chinese Peranakan and Eurasian parentage.

Career
Seah was a model before going into acting. She was 1st runner-up at the Miss Singapore Universe 2006 pageant and signed a contract with MediaCorp soon after the pageant. She is now the new face of Nivea Visage. She was a host in the Singaporean reality television show, The Dance Floor, with co-hosts Glenn Ong and Mark Van Cuylenberg.  She had reported in Today in Beijing on Channel 5, on the day's highlights of the 2008 Summer Olympics in Beijing.

2008 Olympics Controversy
While hosting the 2008 Summer Olympics' program Today in Beijing on Channel 5, Seah was reportedly heard uttering a profanity live on air after wrongly pronouncing the name of a Chinese athlete. The scene shifted from the studio to a recorded clip of a basketball match when the vulgarity was heard. The scene was recorded and uploaded to YouTube. It had led to plenty of discussions on online forums, blogs and also on Facebook. However, her artiste manager denied that Seah had uttered any profanity and MediaCorp confirmed this.

However, the next day, Mr Kenneth Liang, executive vice-president (TV Programming & Production, Channel 5), MediaCorp TV confirmed that Seah had uttered the profanity unintentionally. The microphone was not switched off after her lines were delivered which led to her reaction over the fluff being captured on the program. Seah would not be replaced as the co-host of Today in Beijing.
 In a statement from Channel 5, Seah apologised for the incident and explained her over-reaction.

Personal life
Seah graduated from Tanjong Katong Girls' School, Tampines Junior College and Singapore Management University on the Dean's list with an honours degree in Communications and Marketing. She has both Chinese and Eurasian parentage. She is the only daughter in her family, with two brothers.

On 31 January 2015, Seah married banker Terence Lim at Our Lady of Lourdes Church.

Filmography
 Beach.Ball.Babes 2008
 First Class 2008
 New Beginnings 2010
 C.L.I.F. 2011
 Point Of Entry (season 2) 2011

Variety shows
 Rated:E, as a roving reporter
 The Dance Floor, as a host
 Sweets for my Sweet 2007
 Sports@SG (2009), (2010)

References

External links
Profile on xin.msn.com

See also
The Dance Floor
Miss Singapore Universe 2006
Miss Singapore Universe 2006 finals

Singaporean people of European descent
Singaporean people of Chinese descent
Singapore Management University alumni
Singaporean television actresses
Singaporean female models
Living people
1983 births